High Point is a CDP and unincorporated community in Walker County, in the U.S. state of Georgia.

History
A post office called High Point was established in 1856, and remained in operation until it was discontinued in 1922. The community was named from its lofty elevation near Lookout Mountain.

References

Unincorporated communities in Walker County, Georgia
Unincorporated communities in Georgia (U.S. state)